The Norwegian Centre for Research Data (NSD) is a Norwegian government-owned company responsible for managing data for the research community of Norway. Until 1 March 2016 it was known as Norwegian Social Science Data Services.

The agency is owned by the Ministry of Education and Research, had 90 employees in 2015 and is based in Bergen. It is one of the world's largest archives for research data.

Established in 1971, it was part of the Research Council of Norway until 2003 when it became a limited company owned by the ministry.

NSD operates the Norwegian Scientific Index and the European database ERIH PLUS.

References

External links
Official site

Government-owned companies of Norway
1971 establishments in Norway
Business services companies of Norway
Companies based in Bergen
Business services companies established in 1971